The epididymal secretory protein E1, also known as NPC2( Niemann-Pick intracellular cholesterol transporter 2), is one of two main lysosomal transport proteins that assist in the regulation of cellular cholesterol by exportation of LDL-derived cholesterol from lysosomes. Lysosomes have digestive enzymes that allow it to break down LDL particles to LDL-derived cholesterol once the LDL particle is engulfed into the cell via receptor mediated endocytosis.
NPC2(or, alternatively, epididymal secretory protein E1) works cooperatively with the NPC1 protein to facilitate the exportation of LDL-derived cholesterol out of the lysosome to regulate the concentrations of lipids and cholesterol in the body. Epididymal secretory protein E1 is a protein associated with Niemann-Pick disease, type C, which is one of the 3 types of the Niemann-Pick diseases(Type A,B, and C). This disease can lead to an over accumulation of cholesterol and lipids in different types of tissues, including the brain.  It is caused by a mutation in the NPC2 gene that impairs the bodies ability to transport lipids or cholesterol intracellularly.

Structure 

The epididymal secretory protein E1 is a small soluble glycoprotein consisting of 132 amino acids that is found in a large variety of cells.

Function 

Lysosomal secretion of cholesterol is one part of the regulation of cholesterol in the body. LDL particles are low density lipoproteins that carry cholesterol to cells. LDL particles are engulfed into cells by receptor mediated endocytosis. Once the LDL is engulfed this results in the budding of the receptors to disassemble from the LDL vesicle and move back up to the outer membrane of the cell. This is due to the pH on the outside of the cell being less acidic than the inside of the cell. After this budding process the lysosomes fuse with LDL particles. Lysosomes break down the LDL into cholesterol and other lipids(fatty acids), hence LDL-derived cholesterol. The epididymal secretory protein E1(NPC2) is produced via transcription of the NPC2 gene and recruits and transfers the LDL-derived cholesterol to the sterol-binding pocket in the N-terminal domain of the NPC1 protein to be transferred from the lysosome lumen and excreted from the lysosome membrane.

Clinical significance 
Since the epididymal secretory protein E1 plays a role in the intracellular transport of cholesterol, a mutation in the gene that transcribes it(NPC2 gene) can cause serious issues that lead to Niemann-Pick disease, type C. Niemann-Pick disease, type C is a rare disorder that results in the over accumulation of lipids and cholesterol in different types of tissues in the body due to this protein being ubiquitous. Symptoms vary per individual and can be fatal at birth or go undiagnosed up until adulthood.

See also 

 NPC1
 Low density lipoproteins
 Receptor mediated endocytosis
 Hypercholesterolemia

References

Further reading 

 1. Belleannée C, Labas V, Teixeira-Gomes AP, Gatti JL, Dacheux JL, Dacheux F. Identification of luminal and secreted proteins in bull epididymis. Journal of Proteomics. 2011. doi:10.1016/j.jprot.2010.07.013
 1. Boe-Hansen GB, Rego JPA, Crisp JM, Moura AA, Nouwens AS, Li Y, Venus B, Burns BM, McGowan MR. Seminal plasma proteins and their relationship with percentage of morphologically normal sperm in 2-year-old Brahman (Bos indicus) bulls. Animal Reproduction Science. 2015. doi:10.1016/j.anireprosci.2015.09.003

External links